James Martin Eder (June 24, 1838 – December 26, 1921), known in Colombia as Santiago Martín Eder Kaiser, don Santiago Eder or simply "El Fundador", is considered the pioneer of the sugar industry in Colombia, and is widely recognized as one of Colombia's leading 19th century industrial pioneers.

Early life
Eder was born to a Lithuanian Jewish family in Goldingen in the Duchy of Courland in the Russian Empire. He was the son of Martin Sass Eder and Dorina Kaiser, and was the youngest of their seven children. In 1851 Santiago Eder immigrated from Courland to New York City where his older brother and most of his siblings already lived.  He completed his education and after some work experience entered Harvard Law School in 1858. In 1861 he moved to San Francisco, and from there moved to the Colombian sea port of Buenaventura where he worked as a lawyer and a commercial representative for Panamanian trading firms when Panama was still part of Colombia. In 1864 he bought the Manuelita sugar and coffee farm near the city of Palmira in the Cauca Valley of Colombia. He bought this farm at a public auction in Cali from the father of leading Colombian novelist Jorge Isaacs. In 1866 Eder became the consul of the United States in Buenaventura, as well as the vice-consul of Chile. In 1867 he traveled to London where he met and married Elizabeth 'Lizzie' Benjamin in the New Synagogue.  In their marriage certificate, the name of don Santiago's father is given as 'Moses Eder'. From this marriage were born his children Henry, Charles, Luisa, Walter, Phanor, Fanny and Edith Eder.

Industrial pioneer in Colombia
In 1901, Manuelita became the first Colombian sugar mill to move from mule to steam powered mills. As such, don Santiago became one of Colombia's first industrialists. In 1903 he left his children Charles James and Henry James Eder in charge of his business interests and moved with his wife to New York. He remained there until his death at 83 in 1921. Eder is buried at the Shearith Israel Cemetery in Cypress Hills, Brooklyn. His nephew  Montague David Eder was one of England's leading Zionists.

After his death, the Manuelita sugar company saw further expansions in 1927 and 1939. In 1952 under the management of Harold Henry Eder, Santiago's grandson, Manuelita became the first sugarcane mill in Colombia to make refined sugar. Under Santiago Eder's great-grandson Henry James Eder Manuelita started an international expansion, and today is one of Colombia's leading agro/industrial companies with operations in Colombia, Peru, Brazil and Chile. The current president of Manuelita is Harold Eder Garcés, is don Santiago's great-great-grandson and belongs to the fifth generation of the Eder family in Colombia.

Much of Santiago Eder's correspondence, mostly business-related, but also dealing with the Colombian government and personal family matters, are preserved at the Phanor James Eder Collection at the University of Miami.

References
Eder, Phanor James. (1959).  El fundador Santiago M. Eder. Bogotá: Antares.
EDER, FAMILIA  - article at the Luis Ángel Arango Library, which is administered by Colombia's Bank of the Republic, the central bank.
Phanor James Eder Collection at the University of Miami

See also
 Jews in Colombia

1838 births
1921 deaths
Harvard Law School alumni
Baltic-German people
People from Jelgava
People from Kuldīga
Colombian businesspeople
Colombian people of German descent
Colombian people of Jewish descent
Colombian people of Latvian descent
Colombian Jews
Latvian Jews